Steven  Hamilton (born September 28, 1961) is a former American football defensive end in the National Football League (NFL) for the Washington Redskins. He played college football at East Carolina University and was drafted in the second round of the 1984 NFL Draft.

References

1961 births
Living people
American football defensive ends
East Carolina Pirates football players
Washington Redskins players
Sportspeople from Niagara Falls, New York